Dúrnir was a dwarf who appears in the three Old Norse skaldic poems which suggests that he once was a well-known dwarf in Norse mythology.

The most notable poem is known as Ynglingatal:

He also appears in a list of Dwarves in the anonymous Dverga heiti:

Alþjófr, austri,
aurvangr ok dúfr,
ái, andvari,
ónn ok draupnir,
dori ok dagfinnr,
dulinn ok ónarr,
alfr ok dellingr,
óinn ok durnir.

The third poem is found in Laufás-Edda:

Kveða skal hróðr fyr hríðar
hræ-blakks viðum sævar,
drykkr var Durnis rekkum
døkkr, ljósara nøkkvi.

Snorri also includes Dúrnir in a list of giants in the Skáldskaparmál section of his Prose Edda (Faulkes translation, p. 157).

It is possible that the name Durnir is an emendation of Durinn, mentioned as the father of dwarves in Dvergatal. Both names mean door, or door-warden. The names Durinn and Durnir do not appear in the same texts. The Norwegian translation of Ynglinga Saga from 1900 uses the name of Durinn instead of Durnir.

Notes

Norse dwarves
Jötnar